Looking for Miracles is a 1989 made-for-TV film based on the memoir of the same name by A.E. Hotchner. Filmed primarily  in southern Ontario, it is a story of growing up and relationships, focusing on the experience of two brothers at a summer camp during the Great Depression. The director, producer, and co-writer is Kevin Sullivan.

Synopsis
Set in the summer of 1935, 16-year-old Ryan Delaney (Greg Spottiswood) wants to go to university on a scholarship, but his struggling mother (Patricia Phillips) wants him to stay home, find work, and take care of his 10-year-old brother Sullivan (Zachary Bennett). Due to circumstances relating to the Depression, the brothers were separated and have recently reunited. Ryan is easily annoyed by his little brother. Desperate to find a job, Ryan manages to gain a position as a counselor at Camp Hochelaga despite the fact that he is not qualified; he is too young, has never been to camp, and cannot swim, none of which he reveals during his interview with the camp director, Chief Berman (Joe Flaherty). The ruse is so effective that Ryan is offered the lead counselor position for the group of age 10 boys. After his mother tells him that he cannot go to camp without Sullivan, Ryan convinces Chief Berman to allow the young boy to attend. Being age 10, Sullivan is assigned to Ryan's group.

At the start of camp, Ryan struggles in his position. When he is asked to move a vehicle on the first day, he does not reveal that he cannot drive and ends up having a minor accident. A counselor in Ryan's group named Mo (Hugh Thompson) quickly becomes suspicious of him and comes to realize that he is not qualified. However, he keeps Ryan's secret and the two become good friends. They work together to manage their group of campers, which includes a troubled brat who goes by the nickname of Ratface (Noah Godfrey). Ratface initially is a constant behavior problem for the counselors and is mean to Sullivan. Eventually, though, they come to understand Ratface's troubled home life and the two boys become friends.

The film is a story of growing up. By the end, Ryan and Sullivan develop a close relationship.

Cast
Greg Spottiswood as Ryan Delaney
 Zachary Bennett as Sullivan Delaney
 Joe Flaherty as Chief Berman
 Patricia Gage as Grace Gibson
Patricia Phillips as Mrs. Delaney
Noah Godfrey as Ratface
Paul Haddad as Paul
 Dean Hamilton as Babe
Hugh Thompson as Mo
Eric Fink as Floyd

Awards
 1989 - ACE Award for Best Art Direction
 1989 - ACE Award for Best Costume Design
 1989 - ACE Award for Best Movie
 1989 - Chris Award for Art & Culture - Columbus International Film & Video Festival
 1989 - Giffoni Award - Giffoni Film Festival
 1989 - Ollie Award for Best Outstanding Family Programming - American Children’s Television Festival
 1989 - Silver Hugo Award for Feature Films Made for TV - Chicago International Film Festival
 1989 - Silver Medal for Teen Special Category - New York Film Festival
 1990 - Bronze Award for Feature Made for Television -  The Houston International Film Festival
 1990 - Emmy Award for Best Actor (Greg Spottiswood)
 1990 - Emmy Award nomination for Best Actor (Zachary Bennett)
 1990 - Gemini Award for Best Supporting Actor (Joe Flaherty)
 1990 - Gold Apple Award - National Educational Film & Video Festival
 1990 - International Monitor Award for Best Director (Kevin Sullivan)
 1991 - Best Children’s Film – Canadian Film Celebration, Calgary
 1991 - European Jury Prize for Best Screenplay - Umbriafiction TV Festival, Italy

References

External links
 Sullivan Entertainment: Looking For Miracles
 

1980s coming-of-age films
1980s teen drama films
Canadian drama television films
English-language Canadian films
Films about brothers
Films about children
Films directed by Kevin Sullivan
Films set in 1935
Films about summer camps
1989 films
1989 television films
1989 in Canadian television
1980s Canadian films